The Sarmi-Jayapura Bay languages consist of half a dozen languages spoken on the northern coast of Papua province of Indonesia:
Sobei, Bonggo, Tarpia (Sarmi), Kayupulau, Ormu, Tobati (Jayapura Bay)

Ross (1988) had considered Sarmi and Jayapura Bay (Kayapulau, Orma and Tobati) to be separate but related groups. Ross (1988) listed several additional Sarmi languages: 
Anus (Korur) and Podena, Liki and Wakde (close to Sobei), Masimasi,  Kaptiau, and Yamna.
The inclusion of a supposed Yarsun language appears to be due to confusion of language names with island names. No such language is attested; the island is located between that of the Anus and Podena languages, and all three islands are reported to speak dialects of a single language according to the first source to mention it.

With the exception of certain Micronesian languages, the Sarmi-Jayapura languages have the westernmost distribution out of all Oceanic languages.

Sound correspondences
Grace (1971:34-37) published a table of sound correspondences for the Sarmi languages, from which the following forms are gleaned. The languages are arranged from west to east.

References 

 Grace, George W. (1971). Notes on the phonological history of the Austronesian languages of the Sarmi Coast. Oceanic Linguistics 10:11-37.
 Ross, Malcolm (1988). Proto Oceanic and the Austronesian languages of western Melanesia. Canberra: Pacific Linguistics.
 Proto Oceanic basic vocabulary database

 
Western Oceanic languages
Languages of western New Guinea
Jayapura
Papua (province) culture